The West Michigan Whitecaps are a Minor League Baseball team of the Midwest League and the High-A affiliate of the Detroit Tigers. They are located in Comstock Park, Michigan, a suburb of Grand Rapids, and play their home games at LMCU Ballpark.

Franchise history
The Midwest League came to the Grand Rapids area in 1994 upon the arrival of the former Madison Muskies. The Whitecaps were brought to West Michigan by local businessmen Lew Chamberlin and Dennis Baxter. The Whitecaps were affiliated with the Oakland Athletics before they joined the Tigers' farm system in 1997.

Their home ballpark is LMCU Ballpark in Comstock Park. Before the 2002 season it was known as Old Kent Park; the name was changed when the park's title sponsor, Old Kent Bank, was purchased by Fifth Third Bank. Before the 2021 season, the Lake Michigan Credit Union renamed the venue "LMCU Ballpark". The team's official mascots are Crash the River Rascal, Roxy the River Rascal and Franky the Swimming Pig.

The franchise's attendance record of 547,401 was set in 1996.

Several league and team records were set during the 2006 season.  The team posted the second best record in franchise history, going 89–48, including going 23–6 in July.  Michael Hollimon hit 3 home runs in one game. Cameron Maybin hit 2 grand slams in the season. Michael Hernandez became the first person ever in the history of the Midwest League to hit for the cycle twice.  The Whitecaps went on to defeat the Kane County Cougars in four games to win their fourth Midwest League Championship.

It was so named in part for the ballpark sponsor and part for its 1.6666 (or 5/3) pounds of meat. The Committee requested that the team put a label on the burger indicating that it was a "dietary disaster". To date, more than 100 fans, or about a half of the people who have attempted the challenge, have conquered the burger and earned a commemorative T-shirt. On July 15, 2009, Travel Channel's "Man v. Food" and its host Adam Richman came to Fifth Third Ballpark to attempt to conquer the burger in an episode of the popular show. The episode aired on September 30, 2009, wherein he successfully met the challenge. In 2012, The Whitecaps installed a new scoreboard and high resolution video display screen which was installed by TS Sports out of Dallas, Texas.

On January 3, 2014, a fire started in one of the suites.  It spread and caused extensive damage, close to one half of the suites and 1st base concourse were destroyed.  Thanks to extensive work, the park was restored and up and running by opening day.

In conjunction with Major League Baseball's restructuring of Minor League Baseball in 2021, the Whitecaps were organized into the High-A Central. In 2022, the High-A Central became known as the Midwest League, the name historically used by the regional circuit prior to the 2021 reorganization.

Regular season

Postseason 
The Whitecaps won the best-of-five Midwest League championship six times in six opportunities.  They defeated the Wisconsin Timber Rattlers in 1996, the Rockford Cubbies in 1998, the Kane County Cougars twice (2004 and 2006), the Beloit Snappers in 2007, and the Cedar Rapids Kernels in 2015.  West Michigan is 55–32 all-time in playoff games.

Oakland Athletics affiliation

Detroit Tigers affiliation

Managers
Since 1994, the Whitecaps have had nine managers. In 2007, former Tigers' third baseman Tom Brookens became the fifth manager in the history of the Whitecaps.

Listed here is each manager and their won/loss record:

Detroit Tigers affiliation

Bruce Fields 1997–2000  (331–220)
Brent Gates 2001 (65–72)
Phil Regan 2002–2003 (150–130)
Matt Walbeck 2004–2006 (231–179)
Tom Brookens 2007 (83–57)
Joe DePastino 2008–2010 (215–201)
Ernie Young 2011–2012 (142–135)
Larry Parrish 2013 (69-70)
Andrew Graham 2014–2016 (228-187)
Mike Rabelo 2017 (91-45)
Lance Parrish 2018-2019
Brayan Pena 2021

Roster

Former Whitecaps in the majors 
Below is a list of West Michigan Whitecaps who have played in the major leagues.

Oakland Athletics affiliation (1994–1996)

 Benito Baez 1996
 Jason Beverlin 1995
 Emil Brown 1995
 Ryan Christenson 1996
 Steve Cox 1994
 D. T. Cromer 1994 
 Jeff D'Amico 1994, 1995
 Jeff DaVanon 1996
 Mario Encarnacion 1996
 Ben Grieve 1995
 Ramon Hernandez 1996
 Tim Kubinski 1994
 Jason McDonald 1994
 Chris Michalak 1994
 Willie Morales 1994
 Juan Moreno 1996
 David Newhan 1995
 Derrick White 1996
 George Williams 1994

Detroit Tigers affiliation (1997–present)

 Burke Badenhop 2006
 Adam Bernero 1999
 Willie Blair 1997 Pitched one game on rehab assignment
 Brennan Boesch  2007
 Jeremy Bonderman 2009 Pitched one game on rehab assignment
 Dave Borkowski 1997
 Brent Clevlen 2003
 Francisco Cordero 1997
 Nate Cornejo 1999 
 Casey Crosby 2009
 Freddy Dolsi 2005
 Eulogio de la Cruz 2004
 Eric Eckenstahler 2000
 Robert Fick 1997
 Jason Frasor 1999, 2000
 Tony Giarratano 2004
 Curtis Granderson 2008 Played three games on rehab assignment
 Jack Hannahan 2001
 Michael Hollimon 2006
 Omar Infante 2000
 Brandon Inge 1999
 Matt Joyce 2006
 Jair Jurrjens 2005
 Kris Keller 1999
 Don Kelly 2002
 Rodney Lindsey 1998
 Nook Logan 2001
 Shane Loux 1998, 1999 
 Bobby Lynch 2014
 Cameron Maybin 2006
 Matt Miller 1998
 Dave Mlicki 2000 Pitched one game on rehab assignment
 Brian Moehler 2000 Pitched one game on rehab assignment
 Scott Moore 2003
 Eric Munson 1999
 Magglio Ordóñez 2008 Played one game on rehab assignment
 Adam Pettyjohn 1998
 Luis Pineda 1999
 Mike Rabelo 2002, 2003
 Ryan Raburn 2002, 2003
 Mike Rivera 1998
 Fernando Rodney 2000
 Kenny Rogers 2007 Pitched one game on rehab assignment
 Cody Ross 2000
 Pedro Santana 1997, 1998
 Ramón Santiago 2000
 Jordan Tata 2004
 Clete Thomas 2005
 Andres Torres 1999
 Andy Van Hekken 2000
 Virgil Vasquez 2004
 Chris Wakeland 1997
 Jeff Weaver 1998
 Joel Zumaya 2003
 Nicholas Castellanos 2011

Broadcasting 
In February 2019, the Whitecaps extended their broadcasting contract with Cumulus Media, but switched radio frequencies to air games on the newly-launched "The Ticket" for the 2019 season with radio simulcast on four stations: 106.1-FM and 1340-AM in Grand Rapids, and 99.1-FM and 1490-AM in Muskegon. Select games are aired in Holland, Michigan, on WHTC on 1450-AM and 99.7-FM. Dan Hasty is the Voice of the Whitecaps and also serves as the Host of the Detroit Tigers' Road to Detroit podcast, as well as serving as radio voice of Men's Basketball for the University of Detroit Mercy.

In popular culture 
B-Roll footage of a game between the Whitecaps and South Bend Silver Hawks at Fifth Third Ballpark, was aired in Champ's Whammy! home runs scene in 
Anchorman 2: The Legend Continues. Officials with the West Michigan Whitecaps were unaware they would be featured in the movie and only found out after the movie was released in December 2013.

See also
:Category:West Michigan Whitecaps players

References
Notes

Sources

 Dinda, J. (2003), "Grand Rapids, Michigan, in the Midwest League," http://www.mwlguide.com/cities/grandrapids/index.html
 Official site of the West Michigan Whitecaps, History http://www.whitecaps-baseball.com/BALLPARK/history.html
 Official site of the West Michigan Whitecaps, All-Time Roster http://www.whitecaps-baseball.com/TEAM/allroster.html

External links 

 
 Statistics from Baseball-Reference

Baseball teams established in 1994
Professional baseball teams in Michigan
Detroit Tigers minor league affiliates
Midwest League teams
Sports in Grand Rapids, Michigan
1994 establishments in Michigan
High-A Central teams